Thomas Ho may refer to:

Thomas Ho (actor), British actor of Chinese descent
Thomas Ho (finance), pioneering financial modeller
Tommy Ho, American former tennis player
Thomas Heffernan Ho, Hong Kong equestrian

See also
Ho (surname)